Manso Adubia is a town in the Ashanti Region of Ghana. It is the capital of the Amansie South District. The town is known for the Manso Adubia Senior High School.

References

Populated places in the Ashanti Region